Oonopinus angustatus is a spider species found in Spain, France, Corsica and Algeria.

It is the type species of the genus Oonopinus.

See also 
 List of Oonopidae species

References

External links 

Oonopidae
Spiders of Europe
Spiders of Africa
Invertebrates of North Africa
Fauna of Corsica
Spiders described in 1882